Alessandro Oliverio (1500–1544), was an Italian painter.

Oliverio was active in Venice from 1532 to 1544, and was influenced by Girolamo da Santacroce. He primarily painted landscapes and portraits. His works can be seen in museums such as the National Gallery of Ireland.

References

 Portrait of a Young Man by Alessandro Oliverio, National Gallery of Ireland

16th-century Italian painters
Italian male painters
Painters from Venice
1500 births
1544 deaths